Victoria Brown (born 14 January 1950) is a British retired slalom canoeist who competed in the early and mid-1970s. She finished sixth in the K-1 event at the 1972 Summer Olympics in Munich.

References
Sports-reference.com profile

1950 births
Canoeists at the 1972 Summer Olympics
Living people
Olympic canoeists of Great Britain
British female canoeists
Place of birth missing (living people)